Bolbo Kotha Bashor Ghore is a Bangladeshi Bengali-language romance film. The film was released in 2009 all over Bangladesh. It is directed and written by Shah Mohammad Shagram and produced by Omar Faruk and distributed by Eagel Music. This film is based on romantic with family drama story. It features Shakib Khan, Shabnur, Sahara and many more. It became one of the box-office success films of 2009.

Cast
 Shakib Khan as Iqbal / IK
 Shabnur as Chaity Chowdhury
Anwara as Iqbal's mother
 Sahara as Kajol
 Kazi Hayat
 Omar Sani
 Kabila
 Amol Bose
 Dulari Chakraborty
 Abu Sayed Khan

Crew
 Director: Shah MO. Shagram
 Producer: Omar Farukk
 Story: Shah MO. Shagram
 Script: Shah MO. Shagram
 Music:Shawkat Ali Imon 
 Lyrics: Kabir Bokul
 Distributor: Eagel Music

Technical details
 Format: 35 MM (Color)
 Real: 13 Pans
 Original Language: Bengali
 Country of Origin: Bangladesh
 Date of Theatrical Release: 2009
 Technical Support: Bangladesh Film Development Corporation (BFDC)

Music

Soundtrack

Awards and nominations
Meril Prothom Alo Awards
 Public Choice Awards for Best Film Actress - Shabnur
 Best Actor - Shakib Khan (nom)
 Best Singer (Female) - Kanak Chapa (nom)

References

2009 films
2009 romance films
Bengali-language Bangladeshi films
Bangladeshi romance films
Films scored by Shawkat Ali Emon
2000s Bengali-language films